The singles discography of American country singer-songwriter Dolly Parton includes over 200 singles and spans seven decades. Parton has released 192 singles as a lead artist, 48 as a featured artist and six promotional singles. Parton has also had two charted B-sides and has released 68 music videos. Parton also released 21 singles with Porter Wagoner from 1968 to 1980, bringing her total number of singles to 243.

After releasing two unsuccessful singles as a teenager, Parton signed a recording contract with Monument Records in 1964, and moved to Nashville, Tennessee shortly afterward, releasing a series of singles on the label, the highest charting being her 1965 single "Happy Happy Birthday Baby". In 1967, Monument released Parton's debut solo album, Hello, I'm Dolly, which spawned the hits, "Dumb Blonde" and "Something Fishy", which reached number 24 and number 17 respectively. In September 1967, Parton was asked to replace country vocalist Norma Jean as the co-host of the syndicated country music television show The Porter Wagoner Show, alongside country star Porter Wagoner. The pair recorded 12 albums together for RCA Victor, and in the late 1960s and early 1970s had a series of top 10 hits on the country charts, including "The Last Thing on My Mind", "Tomorrow Is Forever", and "Daddy Was an Old Time Preacher Man". On Wagoner's television series, Parton gained a national audience of millions of viewers, and her own singles began to move up the country charts. By the early 1970s, her solo hits regularly appeared in the top 10, as did her duets with Wagoner. Her first chart-topper, 1970's "Joshua", followed by 1971's "Coat of Many Colors", 1972's "Touch Your Woman", and "Traveling Man" and "Jolene", both from 1973, all reached the top 10 on the US country singles charts, with "Jolene" becoming her second number one single in February 1974.  In mid-1974, Parton split with Wagoner and his show in order to expand her career as a solo artist, writing and recording the number one hit, "I Will Always Love You" as a goodbye to Wagoner.

Following her departure from Wagoner's show, Parton branched out into pop music with her 1977 single "Here You Come Again", which hit number one on the country chart and number 3 on the Billboard Hot 100, helping to produce a string of crossover hits in the late 1970s and early 1980s, including "Two Doors Down", "Heartbreaker", "You're the Only One", "9 to 5" and "But You Know I Love You". In addition, album sales also increased, with many being certified Gold or Platinum by the RIAA.

After a slight commercial decline in the late 1980s, Parton signed with Columbia Records and returned to traditional country music with the album White Limozeen, which spawned the number one country singles, "Why'd You Come in Here Lookin' Like That" and "Yellow Roses". Two more traditional-themed albums were released in the early 1990s that were also successful, Eagle When She Flies (1991) and Slow Dancing with the Moon (1993).

In 1999 she signed a contract with Sugar Hill Records and recorded a series of Bluegrass albums, beginning with The Grass Is Blue in 1999, followed by Little Sparrow (2001) and Halos & Horns (2002). In 2007 she formed her own record label, Dolly Records and the following year issued her first mainstream country album in over 10 years entitled Backwoods Barbie, which produced five singles, including the minor country hit, "Better Get to Livin'", which peaked at number 48 on the Billboard country chart.

Parton holds the distinction of having the most number one hits by a female artist on the Billboard Hot Country Songs chart (25). Parton also holds the record for most top 10 albums on the Billboard Top Country Albums chart (43). She previously held the record for the most top 10 hits by a female country artist until Reba McEntire surpassed her in 2009 with her 56th top 10 hit, "Cowgirls Don't Cry". Parton is the only artist to have top 20 hits on the Billboard Hot Country Songs chart in every decade from the 1960s to the 2010s.

As lead artist

1950s and 1960s

1970s

1980s

1990s

2000s

2010s

2020s

As featured artist

Promotional singles

Charted B-sides

Music videos

See also
List of songs recorded by Dolly Parton

Notes

References

External links

Discographies of American artists
Country music discographies
Singles